Raith ("fort" or "fortified residence"), as an area of Fife, once stretched from the lands of Little Raith (earlier Wester Raith), south of Loch Gelly, as far as Kirkcaldy and the Battle of Raith was once theorised to have been fought here in 596 AD. Raith Hill, west of Auchtertool and immediately to the east of the Mossmorran fractionation plant, may also be in reference to this wider area or may refer to an actual fort on this hill, distinct to the one naming the area.

The name is found in Kirkcaldy's professional football team, Raith Rovers. This name was earlier borne by an entirely distinct team, probably named for the Little Raith colliery, east of Cowdenbeath, which merged with Cowdenbeath Rangers to form Cowdenbeath F. C.

Raith House and the 19th-century folly Raith Tower sit on Cormie Hill to the west of Kirkcaldy and several parts of the town are built on land formerly of the Raith Estate. Robert Lorimer remodelled the library and garden of Raith House in 1899. The modern housing estate bearing the Raith name dates from long after the origins of the football team.

See also
 Robert Ferguson of Raith
 Ronald Craufurd Ferguson
 John Melville of Raith
 Lord Raith, Monymaill and Balwearie

References

External links

 
 History of the county of Fife: from the earliest period to the present time, pp 150–155
 A Descriptive and Historical Gazetteer of the Counties of Fife, Kinross, and Clackmannan, p62-63
 New Statistical Account, under Parish of Abbotshall
 The Raitt Stuff, self-published website containing quotes from various publications and historical documents, in regard to Raith House and its estate

Geography of Fife
Kirkcaldy
Areas of Kirkcaldy
Cowdenbeath